Sebastian Francisco Lletget (born September 3, 1992) is an American professional soccer player who plays as a midfielder for Major League Soccer club FC Dallas.

Early years
Born in San Francisco, California, to Argentine parents, Lletget grew up in South San Francisco, California, where he attended El Camino High School and played for Santa Clara Sporting of Silicon Valley before playing with the United States under-17 residency program. He was spotted playing for Santa Clara by scouts from the West Ham United International academy and moved to England in 2009.

Club career

West Ham United
Lletget signed his first professional contract with West Ham in September 2010.  He played in pre-season friendly games and was an unused substitute for four Premier League games for the 2012–13 season. His career progress was slowed when he contracted mononucleosis. Despite this he signed a contract extension in 2013.  He made his official debut on January 5, 2014 for West Ham in a 5–0 loss against Nottingham Forest at The City Ground in the third round of the FA Cup.

LA Galaxy
On May 8, 2015, Lletget signed for LA Galaxy. Lletget debuted for the Galaxy on May 17, 2015, in the 4–0 loss against Orlando City SC when he replaced Mika Väyrynen in the 69th minute. On May 30, Lletget started for USL affiliate club LA Galaxy II against Colorado Springs that ended in a 2–1 victory for the Galaxy. Lletget made his first start with the first team on June 13 against Columbus Crew, in a match where he scored the opening goal of the game, which was also his first for the Galaxy. Lletget scored again 4 days later in an U.S. Open Cup match against PSA Elite that ended in a 6–1 victory. On June 20, Lletget scored for the third match in a row in a 5–1 victory over the Philadelphia Union. Lletget scored for the fourth match in a row in a 5–0 victory over Portland Timbers on June 24.

In the 2016 season, Lletget scored a brace on June 14, 2016, against UPSL side La Máquina FC in extra-time  of the Fourth Round of the U.S. Open Cup. Lletget again scored a late brace in the U.S. Open Cup, helping the Galaxy move to the semi-finals after 4–2 victory over Seattle Sounders.

After spending the 2017 LA Galaxy season recovering from an injury incurred while playing for the United States national team, Sebastian Lleget opened the scoring for the Galaxy in the 61st minute of the inaugural El Tráfico, adding his first goal since his return. Lletget was then subbed out for the debut of Zlatan Ibrahimović.

New England Revolution

On December 14, 2021, Lletget was acquired by reigning Supporters' Shield holders New England Revolution. He got his first start and goal in the opening match of the season, a 2-2 draw against Portland Timbers. On March 9, 2022, Lleget scored the game winner in the Revolution's quarter final 2022 CONCACAF Champions League matchup against Pumas UNAM. He scored his second MLS league goal on May 21, 2022 in the Revolution's 3-2 win against FC Cincinnati.

FC Dallas

On August 3, 2022, FC Dallas acquired Lletget from the Revolution in exchange for $600,000 in allocation money. The deal would reportedly see the Revolution receive $300,000 in allocation money in 2022 and an additional $300,000 in 2023.

International career
Lletget has played for the United States at under 17, under 20 and under 23 levels.

On January 6, 2017, for the first time, Lletget was called for the United States national team (USMNT) by coach Bruce Arena.
On January 29, 2017, Lletget played his first game for the United States men's national team against Serbia.

On March 24, 2017, Lletget scored his first goal for the United States men's national team in a World Cup qualifier against Honduras. In the same match, he  suffered a Lisfranc injury and was out for six months after undergoing surgery.

On October 1, 2018, Lletget was called up for the first time since sustaining his injury against Honduras for friendlies versus England and Italy.

Lletget appeared in the group stage of the 2019–20 CONCACAF Nations League, starting in the USMNT's 4-1 win over Canada in November 2019. In that tournament's finals, delayed until June 2021 due to the COVID-19 Pandemic, Lletget started in the semi-final, a 1-0 win against Honduras. He appeared as a substitute in the USMNT's 3-2 win in the final against Mexico, entering the match in the 83rd minute. 

Lletget participated in the 2021 CONCACAF Gold Cup for the United States, captaining the team twice in five appearances. He started the final match, a 1-0 United States win over rival Mexico.

Lletget appeared in four qualifiers for the 2022 FIFA World Cup. He scored a goal in a 4-1 road win at Honduras, a rebound from a Ricardo Pepi shot.

Personal life 
In June 2016, it was confirmed that Lletget is in a relationship with singer-songwriter and actress Becky G. In 2020, he appeared in her music video of "My Man". The couple announced their engagement on December 9, 2022.

Career statistics

Club

International

Source: US Soccer

: United States score listed first, score column indicates score after each Lletget goal.

Honors
United States
CONCACAF Gold Cup: 2021
CONCACAF Nations League: 2019–20

Individual
MLS All-Star: 2021

References

External links
 

1992 births
Living people
American soccer players
American expatriate soccer players
West Ham United F.C. players
LA Galaxy players
LA Galaxy II players
New England Revolution players
FC Dallas players
Association football midfielders
Soccer players from San Francisco
American people of Argentine descent
Major League Soccer players
USL Championship players
2021 CONCACAF Gold Cup players
United States men's youth international soccer players
United States men's under-20 international soccer players
United States men's under-23 international soccer players
United States men's international soccer players
Expatriate footballers in England
American expatriate sportspeople in England
CONCACAF Gold Cup-winning players
People from South San Francisco, California